Francis O'Connor (1922 – 29 December 1997) was an Irish basketball player. He competed in the men's tournament at the 1948 Summer Olympics.

References

External links
 

1922 births
1997 deaths
Irish men's basketball players
Olympic basketball players of Ireland
Basketball players at the 1948 Summer Olympics
People from Cahersiveen